Cain Attard (born 10 September 1994) is a Maltese footballer who plays as a defender in Maltese club Birkirkara.

He started his career in Youth Nursery of Melita. In the age of 11 he joined Pietà Hotspurs and in 2011 he started playing in the first team. In August 2015 he signed five-year deal with Birkirkara and on 12 August 2015 he made a debut in this club in the match against Hibernians.

He made a debut in Malta national team on 27 May 2016 in a 0–6 loss to Czech Republic.

References

External links 
 
 
 League statistics at Malta Football Association website
 Profile on the club website

Maltese footballers
Malta international footballers
Association football defenders
Birkirkara F.C. players
Pietà Hotspurs F.C. players
Malta under-21 international footballers
1994 births
Living people